Two Countries is a 2015 Indian Malayalam-language romantic comedy film written by Rafi and directed by Shafi. The film stars Dileep and Mamta Mohandas in the lead roles, with Suraj Venjarammoodu, Mukesh, Aju Varghese and Jagadish appearing in supporting roles. The film was released on 25 December 2015.It Became A Commercial Blockbuster at Box Office. It grossed 10 crores in just 2 days. The film was remade in Telugu as same name with Sunil and in Kannada with Sharan titled Adyaksha in America.

Plot
The plot of the film revolves around Ullas, a cunning procrastinator in his late 20s who makes a living by deceiving people in his hometown. Money is the only motivator that works for him and he wants it without any risks. He decides to marry a disabled woman, Simran, who is the sister of a Maarwadi Patelar, from whom he had borrowed some amount of money. Patelar agreed as he wanted nothing but put a smile on his sister's face. But Ullas' motivation behind the marriage was the assets in favour of her. A name coincidence, resulted in bring Ullas a proposal from an Indo-Canadian rich Malayali woman Laya. He immediately agreed the proposal, and told Patelar that he has left his interest in marrying her sister, who in turn, was furious and became violent. Immigration to Canada and easy money allures him. Only later does Ullas comes to the knowledge that Laya is a chronic alcoholic. The knowledge of funds deposited in her name, that Laya cannot claim due to her alcoholism, and the possibility of access entices him however and he adjusts with the troubles.

In time Ullas falls in love with his alcoholic wife, and the call of a husband makes him care for Laya even in troubles. Laya learns of Ullas's original plan through Avinash, Ullas's friend, accidentally.
This leads to a divorce case. Initially Ullas gains the upper hand from the court, citing his wife is an alcoholic and she needs treatment and that the divorce case is resistance towards it. Laya gets treated through a de-addiction center.

By the guidance of the doctor, Ullas goes with the divorce process to help Laya. Ullas returns and decides to marry Simran again. Patelar reluctantly agreed as Ullas promised he won't change his mind again. Later, Laya understands about the role of Ullas for her wellness and decided to fly back to India to meet Ullas. Ullas on meeting her, requested to never disturb him again in his life as he is planning to marry a woman, whom he deceived before and cannot do the same again. Ullas, regretfully, dresses up and leaves for marriage. On arrival, he discovers that it was all a play by Patelar, as Ullas is deceived by him, for his past activity towards Simran. Ullas, cried mockingly, as things went good as he is reunited with Laya.

Cast

 Dileep as Ullas Kumar
 Mamta Mohandas as Laya Ullas
 Isha Talwar as Simran, Patelar's sister 
 Mukesh as Simon Varghese/ Achayan, Ottawa Malayali Samajam President.
 Aju Varghese as Avinash Kumbalachottil, Ullas's best friend
 Suraj Venjarammoodu as Jimmy Chokliyil, Ullas's friend in Canada
 Jagadish as Ujwal, Ullas's elder brother 
 Rafi as Daniel, Laya's father
Ashokan as Mukundan Kurup, Laya's stepfather
 Vinaya Prasad as Revathi, Laya's mother
 Srinda Arhaan as Jessy / Jessica, Laya's stepmother
 Lena as Adv. Susan, Simon's wife
 Sajitha Betti as Reshmi, Ujwal's wife
 Ajmal Ameer as Ullas Kumaran, a politician
 Makarand Deshpande as Patelar
 Kalasala Babu as Sukumaran, Ullas' father
 Vijayaraghavan as Kochachan, Ullas's uncle
 Shobha Mohan as Radhika, Ullas' mother
 Kalyani Nair as Usha, Avinash's wife
 Hareesh Kanaran as Sajan Koyilandy
 Riyaz Khan as Kiran (cameo)
 Balachandran Chullikadu as Kanaran Master
 Dinesh Prabhakar as Bus Driver (cameo)
 Saju Kodiyan as Chellappan (cameo)
 J. Pallassery as Politician
 Nandu Poduval as Politician Rameshan

Production
Originally, the film was entitled Canadian Tharavu, but this was later changed to "2 Countries" in August 2015. Principal photography started in July 2015 in Canada by CanEast Films Ottawa (Biju George and Satheesh Gopalan) ., Nepean MPP Lisa MacLeod and Ottawa Film Commission actively helped the Team. Team Fondly remembers Lisa's help all through during the shoot. About 80 per cent of the film was shot in Ottawa at locations like ByWard Market, Rideau Canal, Almonte, Manotick, Brockville and Niagara Falls. Filming in Canada was completed on 6 August 2015. A large part of the film was shot in Ottawa, Montreal and a song sequence was filmed at Niagara Falls, becoming the second Malayalam film that shot Niagara, after I. V. Sasi directed Ezham Kadalinakkare in 1979. Filming took place over the course of a month. The second schedule for filming held in Kochi, Kerala. The filming was finished in November 2015.Namitha Pramod signed into play second female lead but was replaced by Isha Talwar.

Release
The film was released in Kerala on 25 December 2015 in the Christmas day. It released in theatres outside Kerala from 22 January 2016, and released in 63 screens in the United Kingdom on 29 January.

Critical reception
The Times of India rated 3.5 out of 5 stars and stated "Packaged with umpteen laugh-out-loud moments, Two Countries is definitely what one would expect from a Dileep movie. The screenplay by Rafi is clean, situational humour with clever quips and the actors hit the ball out of the park with their comic timing".

Box office
The film received a good opening at the box office, grossing  from theatres within five days. It grossed  in twenty days from the Kerala box office. By this time, film already achieved the status of being one of the highest-grossing film in Malayalam.

Soundtrack
The film's soundtrack contains 3 songs, all composed by Gopi Sundar and Lyrics by B. K. Harinarayanan.

References

External links
 

2010s Malayalam-language films
2015 films
Indian romantic comedy films
Films scored by Gopi Sundar
Films shot in Ottawa
Films shot in Toronto
Films shot in Kochi
Malayalam films remade in other languages
Films directed by Shafi
2015 romantic comedy films